Peter Auer (born 1954) is professor of Germanic Linguistics at the University of Freiburg in Freiburg im Breisgau, Germany. Auer graduated from the University of Constance in 1983. He worked at the University of Hamburg before going to Freiburg.

Auer has authored several monographs and edited numerous collections of scholarly research, including work on code-switching, contextualization, multilingualism, dialectology, and other areas of sociolinguistics and applied linguistics. He served as the German science foundation's referee for general linguistics from 2000 to 2008.

Selected publications

References

Sociolinguists
Academic staff of the University of Freiburg
Academic staff of the University of Hamburg
Living people
1954 births
University of Konstanz alumni